"Creole Love Call" is a jazz standard, most associated with the Duke Ellington band and Adelaide Hall. It entered the Billboard USA song charts in 1928 at No. 29.

In 1988, during a radio interview with the journalist and radio host Max Jones, Hall explained how she came up with the counter-melody in "Creole Love Call". An excerpt from the interview can be heard in the British Library article (published 17 December 2020) on the British Library blog titled Oral History of Jazz in Britain.

See also
List of 1920s jazz standards

Notes

References
 A. H. Lawrence, Duke Ellington and His World (London: Routledge, 2001), p. 112. .
 Williams, Iain Cameron, Underneath A Harlem Moon ... the Harlem to Paris Years of Adelaide Hall, Chapter 8. .

External links
"Creole Love Call" at jazzstandards.com

1927 songs
Jazz compositions
1920s jazz standards
Cab Calloway songs
Songs with music by Billy Strayhorn
Songs with music by Duke Ellington